Jacob Otto Dietrich (31 August 1897 – 22 November 1952) was a German SS officer during the Nazi era, who served as the Press Chief of the Nazi regime and was a confidant of Adolf Hitler.

Biography

Otto Dietrich was born in Essen, he served as a soldier during World War I and was awarded the Iron Cross (First Class). Afterwards he studied at the universities of Munich, Frankfurt am Main and Freiburg, from which he graduated with a doctorate in political science in 1921.

Dietrich worked for newspapers in Essen and Munich. In 1929 he became a member of the Nazi Party (NSDAP) as a Personal Press Referent. Here he was able to introduce Hitler to numerous important officials within different sects of the mining industry to help secure funding for the Nazi Party. On 1 August 1931 he was appointed Press Chief of the NSDAP, and the following year joined the SS. On 2 June 1933 Hitler appointed Dietrich a Reichsleiter, the second highest political rank in the Nazi Party. On 1 November, he was named Vice-President of the Reich Press Chamber (Reichspressekammer) under Max Amann. On February 28, 1934, Hitler raised Dietrich to the position of Reich Press Chief of the Nazi Party.  In March 1936 he was elected as a Nazi member of the Reichstag. On 26 November 1937, Dietrich became the Reich Press Chief of the Government and a State Secretary in the Reich Ministry of Public Enlightenment and Propaganda. On April 20, 1941 he had risen to the rank of SS-Obergruppenführer.

In the decree from Hitler on February 28, 1934 the role of the Reich Press Chief was loosely explained: "He directs in my name the guiding principles for the entire editorial work of the Party Press.  In addition, as my Press Chief he is the highest authority for all press publications of the Party and all its agencies."  Dietrich, as the Press Chief of the Nazi Party and later as the Reich Press Chief of the Government, had control over the Nazi party's publications and newspapers.  This included anything disseminated to the SS, SA, Hitler Youth, and the German Labor Front.  The work done by Dietrich helped to secure the Nazis foothold in Germany. He aided party members to acquire positions of power and general acceptance within different communities and helped to spread Nazi ideology to the public.

His job as Press Chief overlapped with Joseph Goebbels's Ministry of Public Enlightenment and Propaganda, and thus many anecdotes exist of their feuds. They were infamous for their disagreements, and both often felt obliged to "repair" the mistakes of the other.  Dietrich believed himself to be the supreme commander over the German press and so sought to lessen Goebbels's influence within the Press Department.

Dietrich had a close relationship with Hitler.  In some testimony from Hans Fritzsche, the head of the German Press Division from December 1938 to November 1942, who worked under Dietrich, he noted that: "For years he (Dietrich) also summarized the press telegrams, which constituted one of the most important sources of information for Hitler.  Finally I could see for myself that he elaborated Hitler's speeches for publication.  Thus Dr. Dietrich also functioned as the transmitter of Hitler's current directives to Dr. Goebbels." However, in the secrecy mandated by war, Dietrich, who was not in Hitler's "inner circle," often did not truly know of Hitler's whereabouts.

Dietrich retained the confidence of the Führer throughout the regime until Hitler accused him of defeatism and placed him on indefinite leave after an argument on 30 March 1945.  After the war ended, he was arrested by the British. In 1949, he was tried at the Subsequent Nuremberg Trials, where he was convicted of crimes against humanity and being a member of a criminal organization, namely the SS, and was sentenced to seven years' imprisonment. He was released in 1950. At the age of 55 Dietrich died in November 1952 in Düsseldorf.

Memoir: The Hitler I Knew

In captivity in Landsberg Prison, Dietrich wrote The Hitler I Knew. Memoirs of the Third Reich's Press Chief, a book sharply critical of Hitler personally and strongly denouncing the crimes committed in the name of Nazism. The first part of the book contains assessments by Dietrich about his character, his reflections on Hitler as a politician and as a soldier, and his critique of his leadership. The second part (Scenes from Hitler's Life) describes Dietrich's first-hand oberservations of Hitler's daily activities before and during the war. The book translated by Richard and Clara Winston was published by Methuen in 1957, and republished in 2010 by Skyhorse Publishing, with a new introduction by historian Roger Moorhouse.

Publications
 Dietrich O. The Hitler I Knew. Memoirs of the Third Reich's Press Chief. Skyhorse Publishing, 2010.

References

Citations

Bibliography
Hardy, Alexander G. (1967). Hitler's Secret Weapon: The "Managed" Press and Propaganda Machine of Nazi Germany. New York: Vantage Press.

Further reading

External links 

Die philosophischen Grundlagen des Nationalsozialismus "The Philosophical Foundations of National Socialism" by Otto Dietrich
The Führer and the German People An essay by Dietrich
With Hitler On the Road to Power by Otto Dietrich
 

1897 births
1952 deaths
People from Essen
People from the Rhine Province
SS-Obergruppenführer
Recipients of the Iron Cross (1914), 1st class
Nazi Party officials
Nazi propagandists
Reichsleiters
People convicted by the United States Nuremberg Military Tribunals
German people convicted of crimes against humanity
Members of the Reichstag of Nazi Germany
German Army personnel of World War I
University of Freiburg alumni